The 2012–13 Euro Hockey Tour was the 17th season of Euro Hockey Tour. It started on 7 November 2012 and ended on 28 April 2013. A total of 24 games were played, with each team playing 12 games. The season consisted of the Karjala Tournament, the Channel One Cup, the Oddset Hockey Games, and the Kajotbet Hockey Games. Russia won the tournament.

Total standings

Karjala Tournament

The 2012 Karjala Tournament was played between 7–10 November 2012, and was won by Czech Republic. Five of the matches were played in Turku, Finland, and one match in Prague, Czech Republic.

Channel One Cup

The 2012 Channel One Cup was played between 13 and 16 December 2012. Five of the matches were played in the Moscow, Russia, and one match in Helsinki, Finland. The tournament was won by Russia.

Oddset Hockey Games

The 2013 Oddset Hockey Games was played between 6–10 February 2013. Five of the matches were played in Malmö, Sweden, and one match in Saint Petersburg, Russia. Finland won the tournament.

Kajotbet Hockey Games

The 2013 Kajotbet Hockey Games was played between 25 and 28 April 2013.

Statistics

Scoring leaders
List shows the top skaters sorted by points, then goals. If the list exceeds 10 skaters because of a tie in points, all of the tied skaters are shown.
GP = Games played; G = Goals; A = Assists; Pts = Points; PIM = Penalties in minutes; POS = Position  positions: F = Forward; RW = Right winger; LW = Left winger; C = Centre; D = DefencemanSource:

Leading goaltenders
Only the top five goaltenders, based on save percentage, who have played 40% of their team's minutes, are included in this list.
TOI = Time on ice (minutes:seconds); SA = Shots against; GA = Goals against; GAA = Goals against average; Sv% = Save percentage; SO = Shutouts
Source: [Source] 
Updated: (UTC)

Rosters
These tables shows all skaters and goaltenders who have at least one game in the Euro Hockey Tour 2012–13. The tables show how many games they played, how many points they've scored, and their penalties in minutes.

POS = Position; GP = Games played; G = Goals; A = Assists; Pts = Points; PIM = Penalties In Minutes

Source: [source link] 

Updated: (UTC)

Czech Republic

Finland

Russia

Sweden

References

 
2012–13 in European ice hockey
Euro Hockey Tour